Kilroot Recreation Football Club, more commonly known as Kilroot Rec., was a Northern Irish football club based in Whitehead, County Antrim. They played in Division 1C of the Northern Amateur Football League. The club was founded in 1962 and was  a member of the Amateur League since 1982.Kilroot were dissolved in April 2015. Club colours were red and black.

The club participated in the Irish Cup.

References

External links
 Club web site
 nifootball.co.uk - (For fixtures, results and tables of all Northern Ireland amateur football leagues)

Association football clubs in County Antrim
Northern Amateur Football League clubs
Defunct association football clubs in Northern Ireland
Association football clubs established in 1962
Association football clubs disestablished in 2015
1962 establishments in Northern Ireland
2015 disestablishments in Northern Ireland